NeuN is a Japanese manga series written and illustrated by Tsutomu Takahashi. It was serialized in Kodansha's seinen manga magazine Weekly Young Magazine from May 2017 to February 2020, with its chapters collected in six tankōbon volumes.

Publication
Written and illustrated by Tsutomu Takahashi, NeuN was first published as a three-one-shot chapter story in Kodansha's seinen manga magazine Weekly Young Magazine from January 16 to April 17, 2017. It was later published as a full-fledged series in the same magazine, on a monthly basis, from May 22, 2017, to February 3, 2020. Kodansha collected its chapters in six tankōbon volumes, released from September 6, 2019, to February 6, 2020.

Volume list

References

External links
 

Cultural depictions of Adolf Hitler
Kodansha manga
Seinen manga